Sir William FitzHerbert, 1st Baronet (1748–1791) was the first baronet Fitzherbert of Tissington. He was a lawyer and recorder for Derby. He was an usher to King George III. He owned a number of plantations for sugar and coffee in Jamaica and Barbados.

Biography
Fitzherbert was born 27 May 1748 to William, Member of Parliament for Derby, and Mary Fitzherbert of Tissington Hall. He attended Westminster School and St John's College, Cambridge, graduating M.A. in 1770. He toured Europe with his neighbour William Cavendish, later fifth Duke of Devonshire, when they were both about twenty. After leaving Paris they visited the major cities of Italy, including Rome and Florence, where Fitzherbert commissioned portraits of himself and his companion from Thomas Patch and Pompeo Batoni respectively.

He served as Gentleman Usher to King George III and was rewarded with portraits of the king and queen. On 14 October 1777 he married Sarah Perrin in London and through her inherited five plantations in Jamaica. These were four sugar plantations of Blue Mountain, Forest, Grange Hill and Vere and the coffee plantation of Retrieve Mountain.
Fitzherbert became a baronet on 22 January 1784 and retired to the family seat of Tissington Hall. On his death in 1791 he was buried at Tissington and was succeeded by Anthony Perrin Fitzherbert his son with Sarah, his wife. William's younger brother Alleyne FitzHerbert was a diplomat who became Baron St Helens in 1791.

Anthony Fitzherbert, the second Baronet, died suddenly on 2 April 1798 of a "sudden consumption" at the age of nineteen. He was succeeded by Henry, his brother, the third son of the first Baronet.

Major works
Maxims and Reflections (1784)
Short Enquiry into showing the origin and ancient privileges of Knights Banneret (1779)

References

Alumni of St John's College, Cambridge
Baronets in the Baronetage of Great Britain
People from Derbyshire Dales (district)
1748 births
1791 deaths